Downing Street is a street in London, England, that houses the official residence of the Prime Minister and other government offices

Downing Street may also refer to:
 Downing Street, Cambridge, England
 Downing Street, George Town, Penang, Malaysia
 Downing Street School, a historic school building at 92 Downing Street in Worcester, Massachusetts
 10 Downing Street, the address of the First Lord of the Treasury and Prime Minister of the United Kingdom